Trent Lott (born 1941) was a U.S. Senator from Mississippi from 1989 to 2007. 

Senator Lott may also refer to:

Elisha Everett Lott (1820–1864), Texas State Senate
Hiram R. Lott (1829–1895), Louisiana State Senate
John A. Lott (1806–1878), New York State Senate

See also

 Lott (disambiguation)